Doritites bosniackii is a fossil swallowtail butterfly in the subfamily Parnassiinae. It was described by Rebel in 1898. The genus and its sole species was described from the Miocene of Tuscany, Italy.

References
Hancock, D.L., 1983. Classification of the Papilionidae (Lepidoptera): a phylogenetic approach. Smithersia 2: 1-48.
Nazari, V., Zakharov, E.V., Sperling, F.A.H., 2007. Phylogeny, historical biogeography, and taxonomic ranking of Parnassiinae (Lepidoptera, Papilionidae) based on morphology and seven genes. Molecular Phylogenetics and Evolution, 42: 131–156.
Rebel, H., 1898. Doritites bosniaskii. Sitzungsberichte der akademie der wissenschaften. Mathematischen-naturwissenschaftliche classe. Abteilung 1: Mineralogie, biologie, erdkunde.Wien. 107: 734–741, 745.

External links
TOL Picture
Kyoto University

†
Fossil Lepidoptera
Miocene insects
Fossils of Italy
Taxa named by Hans Rebel
†